The 1996 Mid-Eastern Athletic Conference men's basketball tournament took place February 29–March 2, 1996, at the Leon County Civic Center in Tallahassee, Florida.  defeated , 69–56 in the championship game, to win its second MEAC Tournament title.

The Bulldogs earned an automatic bid to the 1996 NCAA tournament as No. 15 seed in the West region. In the round of 64, South Carolina State fell to No. 2 seed Kansas 92–54.

Format
Eight of ten conference members participated with play beginning with the quarterfinal round.

Bracket

* denotes overtime period

References

MEAC men's basketball tournament
1995–96 Mid-Eastern Athletic Conference men's basketball season
MEAC men's basketball tournament